Kevin Bonifazi (born 19 May 1996) is an Italian professional footballer who plays as a centre-back for Bologna.

Club career
He began his playing career with Tor di Quinto and Nuova Tor Tre Teste. At age 15 he was sold to Siena, but following the bankruptcy of the club was signed by Torino in 2014. He won the Campionato Nazionale Primavera with the Granata in the 2014–15 season.

The following season, he was loaned to Benevento in Lega Pro. He made his professional debut on 20 September 2015 in a game against Foggia. In January 2016, he was loaned to Casertana. He scored his first goal for the club on 14 February 2016, a home draw against Juve Stabia.

On 19 July 2016, Torino officially announced his loan to SPAL in Serie B. He made his competitive debut for SPAL on 22 October in a 3–1 home win against Carpi. He scored his first goal for the club on 3 December, a 2–1 win away to Cittadella. On 17 March 2017, Torino announced they had renewed his contract until 2022.

He made his senior debut for Torino on 29 November, in the Coppa Italia against Carpi. On 31 March 2018, he made his Serie A debut, entering as a substitute for Nicolas Nkoulou in a 4–0 win against Cagliari in Sardinia.

On 16 August 2018, he returned to SPAL on loan with an option to buy, and a buy-back option in favour of Torino. On 20 October, he scored his first Serie A goal in a 2–0 victory against Roma in his first appearance back at SPAL.

On 24 January 2020 he returned to SPAL once more on loan, which turned into a permanent transfer at the end of the 2019–20 season as certain conditions were met. He also signed a 4.5-year contract with SPAL.

On 25 September 2020, he joined Udinese on loan with an option to buy.

On 2 July 2021, he moved to Bologna.

International career
On 1 September 2017 he made his debut with the Italy U21 team in a friendly match lost 3–0 against Spain.

Personal life 
On 22 August 2020 he tested positive for COVID-19.

Career statistics

Honours

Club
Torino
Campionato Primavera: 2014–15

SPAL
Serie B: 2016–17

References

External links
 

1996 births
Living people
Sportspeople from the Province of Rieti
Association football defenders
Italian footballers
Italy under-21 international footballers
Benevento Calcio players
Casertana F.C. players
S.P.A.L. players
Torino F.C. players
Udinese Calcio players
Bologna F.C. 1909 players
Serie A players
Serie B players
Serie C players
Footballers from Lazio